Musa Salam oghlu Mammadov (July 15, 1932 — March 12, 2019) was a Deputy of the Supreme Soviet of the Azerbaijan SSR (X-XII convocation), Deputy Prime Minister of the Azerbaijan Republic (1992-2017), State Counselor, Chairman of the Republican Forestry Production Union (1989-2001), Doctor of Economics, Candidate of Agricultural Sciences, Honored Agronomist.

Biography 
Musa Mammadov was born on July 15, 1932, in Qutqashen. He graduated from high school in 1948, and in 1952 from the agronomy faculty of the Azerbaijan Agricultural Institute with honors. Musa Mammadov, who entered the graduate school in the same year, defended his dissertation in 1956 and received the degree of Candidate of Sciences. He is the author of 40 scientific works, many monographs, several books and inventions related to the development of various fields of agriculture and forestry.

Musa Mammadov died on March 12, 2019, in Baku.

Career 
For a while he worked at the Azerbaijan Agricultural Institute as a teacher, director of educational and experimental farms. In 1964, he was appointed head of the department of the Ministry of Agriculture. From 1968 to 1970 he served as Deputy Chairman of the State Committee for Bakery and Mixed Feed Industry, and from 1970 to 1979 as Deputy Minister of Supply of the Republic. Later, he was promoted to the position of chairman of "Azerkendkimya" Scientific-Production Association. Musa Mammadov, worked as an acting chairman until 1984, was deputy chairman of the Council of Ministers of the Azerbaijan SSR for a year, first deputy chairman and chairman of the State Committee for Agrarian Industry in 1985-1989, chairman of the Republican Forestry Production Union in 1989-2001.

Musa Mammadov was also elected a member of the board of the USSR Ministry of Agriculture. In 1992, he was appointed Deputy Prime Minister of the Republic of Azerbaijan. Until his death, he worked as an adviser to the Minister of Agriculture.

Awards 
He was awarded the Order of the Red Banner of Labour, the Order of the October Revolution, the Order of the Badge of Honour twice and various medals. He was twice awarded the Honorary Decree of the Supreme Soviet of the Republic, two gold, two silver and bronze medals of the All-Union Exhibition of National Economic Achievements, and twice was awarded the Honorary Diplomas of the exhibition. Laureate of the State Prize for Science and Technology, awarded the title of Honored Agronomist of the Republic. He was awarded a personal scholarship by the President of the Republic of Azerbaijan for his invaluable services in improving the management of the agricultural sector in the country.

References 

1932 births
2019 deaths
Soviet politicians
Azerbaijani politicians
People from Qabala District
Azerbaijan State Agricultural University alumni
Recipients of the Order of the Red Banner of Labour